Samuel Feiser Glatfelter (April 7, 1858 – April 23, 1927) was a Democratic member of the U.S. House of Representatives from Pennsylvania.

Early life
Samuel F. Glatfelter was born near Loganville, Pennsylvania. He attended the York County Academy and Pennsylvania College at Gettysburg, Pennsylvania. He was engaged in teaching for several years, and later became a building contractor and also interested in banking.

Career
Glatfelter was elected as a Democrat to the Sixty-eighth Congress, defeating three other candidates including Republican Mahlon Haines, but was an unsuccessful candidate for reelection in 1924. He resumed his business as a building contractor.

Died
Glatfelter died in York, Pennsylvania, aged 69. He was interred in Prospect Hill Cemetery. Cause of death according to the coroner's records was carcinoma of the intestines. He was survived by his wife, Ida A. Glatfelter.

Various properties and lots of land he owned at the time of his death were sold or auctioned off on September 22, 1927.

References

External links

Samuel F. Glatfelter at The Political Graveyard

1858 births
1927 deaths
People from York County, Pennsylvania
Democratic Party members of the United States House of Representatives from Pennsylvania
Deaths from cancer in Pennsylvania